This is a list of satellites in geosynchronous orbit (GSO). These satellites are commonly used for communication purposes, such as radio and television networks, back-haul, and direct broadcast. Traditional global navigation systems do not use geosynchronous satellites, but some SBAS navigation satellites do. A number of weather satellites are also present in geosynchronous orbits. Not included in the list below are several more classified military geosynchronous satellites, such as PAN.

A special case of geosynchronous orbit is the geostationary orbit, which is a circular geosynchronous orbit at zero inclination (that is, directly above the equator). A satellite in a geostationary orbit appears stationary, always at the same point in the sky, to ground observers. Popularly or loosely, the term "geosynchronous" may be used to mean geostationary. Specifically, geosynchronous Earth orbit (GEO) may be a synonym for geosynchronous equatorial orbit, or geostationary Earth orbit. To avoid confusion, geosynchronous satellites that are not in geostationary orbit are sometimes referred to as being in an inclined geostationary orbit (IGSO).

Some of these satellites are separated from each other by as little as 0.1° longitude. This corresponds to an inter-satellite spacing of approximately 73 km. The major consideration for spacing of geostationary satellites is the beamwidth at-orbit of uplink transmitters, which is primarily a factor of the size and stability of the uplink dish, as well as what frequencies the satellite's transponders receive; satellites with discontiguous frequency allocations can be much closer together.

As of May 2022, the website UCS Satellite Database lists 5,465 known satellites. This includes all orbits and everything down to the little CubeSats, not just satellites in GEO. Of these, 560 are listed in the database as being at GEO. The website provides a spreadsheet containing details of all the satellites, which can be downloaded.

Listings are from west to east (decreasing longitude in the Western Hemisphere and increasing longitude in the Eastern Hemisphere) by orbital position, starting and ending with the International Date Line. Satellites in inclined geosynchronous orbit are so indicated by a note in the "remarks" columns.

Western hemisphere

Eastern Hemisphere

In transit

Historical

References

External links 
 SatcoDX, a useful 3rd party resource
 Lyngsat, a useful 3rd party resource
 Satbeams – satellite footprints
 TrackingSat – List of satellites in geostationary orbit
 Zarya.info's list of satellites in geosynchronous orbit, updated daily

Geosynchronous orbit
Geo